To Market To Market is a 1987 Australian political film directed by Virginia Rouse, who was once an assistant to Paul Cox, and starring Philip Quast.

The film was made with funding from the Australian Film Commission and Film Victoria.

References

External links

To Market to Market at Philip Quast Website

Australian drama films
1987 films
1980s English-language films
1980s Australian films